Dudley George Simpson (4 October 1922 – 4 November 2017) was an Australian composer and conductor. He was the Principal Conductor of the Royal Opera House orchestra for three years and worked as a composer on British television. He worked on the BBC science-fiction series Doctor Who, for which he composed incidental music during the 1960s and 1970s. When Simpson died aged 95 in 2017, The Guardian wrote that he was "at his most prolific as the creator of incidental music for Doctor Who in the 1960s and 70s, contributing to 62 stories over almost 300 episodes – more than any other composer."

Among his television work was the music for Moonstrike (1963), theme music for The Brothers (1972), The Tomorrow People (1973), Moonbase 3 (1973), The Ascent of Man (1973) and Blake's 7 (1978). He also composed music for several plays from the BBC Television Shakespeare series.

Early life and career
Simpson was born in the Melbourne suburb of Malvern East. He learned piano as a child, served in New Guinea during World War II and then studied orchestration and composition at the Melbourne Conservatorium of Music at the University of Melbourne. Simpson became assistant conductor, pianist and later musical director for the Borovansky Ballet Company, forerunner to The Australian Ballet. He moved to the UK and after a season as guest conductor at Covent Garden, he became Principal Conductor of the Royal Opera House orchestra for three years. He accompanied the touring section of the Royal Ballet with Margot Fonteyn as principal ballerina.

Simpson started working for the BBC in 1961.

Music for science fiction television

Doctor Who (1963) 
Simpson's first work on Doctor Who was during William Hartnell's era as the First Doctor in Planet of Giants, in 1964, but he is primarily associated with the programme in the 1970s. He also appeared on screen as a music hall conductor in the Fourth Doctor story The Talons of Weng-Chiang (1977) at the invitation of Philip Hinchcliffe, who was the producer at the time. Simpson had to be paid a special fee for this appearance, as he was a member of the Musicians' Union and not Equity.

When John Nathan-Turner became producer of Doctor Who in 1980, he decided that the music needed to be updated, and took Simpson out for a meal telling him how much he appreciated his work on Doctor Who but that it would no longer be required as he intended to have the BBC Radiophonic Workshop provide music from that point. While Simpson was contracted to score Shada, the unfinished nature of that production meant he never started work. As a result, his last broadcast work on Doctor Who was for The Horns of Nimon.

In 1993 Simpson's music for five Doctor Who serials from the early Fourth Doctor era was released on an album called Pyramids of Mars.

In the 2017 restoration of Shada, a dedication to Simpson was shown in the end credits.

Blake's 7 (1978)
In 1978 the BBC launched a new science fiction series, Blake's 7, produced by former Doctor Who director David Maloney. It ran for 4 series and 52 episodes. Simpson provided the theme music for the series and was also responsible for the incidental music for 50 of the episodes that were broadcast from 2 January 1978 to 21 December 1981. The two exceptions are the episode entitled "Duel" (the eighth episode of series one) for which director Douglas Camfield chose to use stock music, and "Gambit" (the eleventh episode of series two), which was scored by Elizabeth Parker of the Radiophonic Workshop, the special sound creator of series two to four.

The Tomorrow People (1973)
Simpson composed the theme tune to the ITV-based Thames Television science fiction series The Tomorrow People (1973–1979).

Doctor Who credits
Between 1964 and 1980, Simpson composed the incidental music for the following Doctor Who serials:

 Planet of Giants
 The Crusade
 The Chase
 The Celestial Toymaker
 The Underwater Menace
 The Macra Terror
 The Evil of the Daleks
 The Ice Warriors
 Fury from the Deep
 The Seeds of Death
 The Space Pirates
 The War Games
 Spearhead from Space
 The Ambassadors of Death
 Terror of the Autons
 The Mind of Evil
 The Claws of Axos
 Colony in Space
 The Dæmons
 Day of the Daleks
 The Curse of Peladon
 The Time Monster
 The Three Doctors
 Carnival of Monsters
 Frontier in Space
 Planet of the Daleks
 The Green Death
 The Time Warrior
 Invasion of the Dinosaurs
 The Monster of Peladon
 Planet of the Spiders
 Robot
 The Ark in Space
 The Sontaran Experiment
 Genesis of the Daleks
 Planet of Evil
 Pyramids of Mars
 The Android Invasion
 The Brain of Morbius
 The Masque of Mandragora
 The Hand of Fear
 The Deadly Assassin
 The Face of Evil
 The Robots of Death
 The Talons of Weng-Chiang
 Horror of Fang Rock
 The Invisible Enemy
 Image of the Fendahl
 The Sun Makers
 Underworld
 The Invasion of Time
 The Ribos Operation
 The Pirate Planet
 The Stones of Blood
 The Androids of Tara
 The Power of Kroll
 The Armageddon Factor
 Destiny of the Daleks
 City of Death
 The Creature from the Pit
 Nightmare of Eden
 The Horns of Nimon

References

External links

1922 births
2017 deaths
Australian classical pianists
Australian conductors (music)
Australian emigrants to England
Australian expatriates in the United Kingdom
Australian television composers
Male classical pianists
Male conductors (music)
Male television composers
University of Melbourne alumni
Musicians from Melbourne
People from Malvern, Victoria